Longbeck is a railway station on the Tees Valley Line, which runs between  and  via . It is owned by Network Rail and managed by Northern Trains.

History
The station was opened in May 1985 by British Rail. The small signal box here supervises the junction and station area at nearby  and the freight line to Boulby as well as the adjacent level crossing.

Facilities
The station is unstaffed. A round of improvements made here in 2012 included new fully lit waiting shelters, renewed station signage and the installation of CCTV. Digital information screens have been installed, whilst the long-line Public Address system (PA) has been renewed and upgraded with pre-recorded train announcements; running information can also be obtained by telephone and timetable posters.  Step-free access is available to both platforms.

Services

As of the May 2021 timetable change, the station is served by two trains per hour between Saltburn and Darlington via Middlesbrough, with one train per hour extending to Bishop Auckland. An hourly service operates between Saltburn and Bishop Auckland on Sunday. All services are operated by Northern Trains.

Rolling stock used: Class 156 Super Sprinter and Class 158 Express Sprinter

References

External links
 
 

Railway stations in Redcar and Cleveland
DfT Category F2 stations
Railway stations opened by British Rail
Railway stations in Great Britain  opened in 1985
Northern franchise railway stations